"Always Wanting You" is a song written and recorded by American country music artist Merle Haggard and The Strangers. It was released in February 1975 as the second single from the album Keep Movin' On.  The song was Haggard and The Strangers twentieth number-one single on the U.S. country chart.  It stayed at number one for two weeks and spent a total of ten weeks on the chart.

Content
According to interviews, it was written for Dolly Parton, because Haggard fell in love with her while recording her song "Kentucky Gambler", but knew he could never have her, as both he and Parton were married to others. This is the story of a song in which the performer expresses love for another person in the storyline. In country music, that is pretty ordinary. The big difference here is that Haggard was professing his real-life love for an artist that he had become infatuated with while on tour with her: Dolly Parton. He did not mention Parton by name in the song, of course, but it became common knowledge that is who he was singing about, and he had no problem talking publicly about his feelings regarding Dolly. She and Merle had toured a lot together during 1974–75, and during that time they spent large blocks of time with each other. Traveling from show to show, she would ride on his bus or he would ride on hers, and they talked a great deal about music and their personal goals. Not only that, Haggard expressed his desires for a more intimate relationship on several occasions, but Dolly insisted throughout that it could never work (she was married, but he was between wives at the time). Although her husband Carl Dean never went on tour with her, she insisted that she loved only him, and would never cheat on him. Nonetheless, Haggard's desires persisted.

The situation got to the point that Haggard literally could not get Parton off his mind. He would envision her when he walked out on stage to do a show, when he went to sleep at night and when he woke up in the morning. He tried everything to put her out of his mind, but nothing worked. Haggard was the type of songwriter who could be inspired by the least little thing which might trigger an idea for a song. But this infatuation with Parton was big and it completely overwhelmed him. So, of course, there had to be a song come out of it. He proudly wrote "Always Wanting You" specifically for the object of his desire. In fact, he was so proud of his accomplishment that he telephoned Parton at three o’clock one morning from Reno, Nevada and sang the song to her right over the phone (hoping this could possibly impress her enough to give in). Once again, she explained her inability to get involved and eventually, after she listened to the song and his pleading, he finally allowed her to go back to sleep.

This episode became a matter of public record after its inclusion in Haggard's book Sing Me Back Home: My Own Story. Haggard was not embarrassed about it, nor did Parton claim to be. She handled it with her usual grace, saying that she was more flattered than anything about him feeling that way. By withholding her temptation (if she ever was tempted) and Haggard not claiming that they had had an affair (so the issue of a scandal was avoided), were the two things she says kept the embarrassment in check. She wrapped it up neatly by simply saying that Haggard is a very special friend to her, and it was very bold and sweet of him to tell her that he cared that much.

Although written especially for Parton, "Always Wanting You" was Haggard's first and only number one single to feature Louise Mandrell. She toured with Haggard's band for six months, and when he recorded the song at Jack Clement Studios in Nashville, she joined Ronnie Reno as a supporting vocalist. "Always Wanting You" reached the pinnacle of Billboard's Hot Country Singles chart on April 12, 1975, and was strong enough to remain in that position for two weeks. It was Haggard's sixth number one single in a row, and the 20th of his eventual 38 chart-toppers, the third most in history.

Personnel
Merle Haggard– vocals, guitar

The Strangers:
Roy Nichols – lead guitar
Norman Hamlet – steel guitar, dobro
 Tiny Moore – mandolin
 Ronnie Reno – guitar
 Mark Yeary – piano
 Johnny Meeks - bass
Biff Adam – drums
Don Markham – saxophone

Charts

Weekly charts

Year-end charts

Popular Culture
In 2004, "Always Wanting You" was featured on the radio station K-Rose in the video game Grand Theft Auto: San Andreas.

References

1975 singles
1975 songs
Merle Haggard songs
Songs written by Merle Haggard
Song recordings produced by Ken Nelson (American record producer)
Capitol Records singles
Torch songs